Austin Sarsfield Ireland "Grally" Gralton (9 February 1871 – 1 July 1919) was a rugby union player who represented Australia.

Gralton, a scrum-half, was born in Kempsey, New South Wales and claimed three international rugby caps for Australia. His debut game was against Great Britain at Sydney, on 24 June 1899, the inaugural rugby Test match played by an Australian national representative side.

Published references
 Collection (1995) Gordon Bray presents The Spirit of Rugby, Harper Collins Publishers Sydney
 Howell, Max (2005) Born to Lead - Wallaby Test Captains, Celebrity Books, Auckland NZ

Footnotes

Australian rugby union players
Australia international rugby union players
1871 births
1919 deaths
People from the Mid North Coast
Rugby union players from New South Wales
Rugby union scrum-halves